Valencia has had 60 managers in its history.

The first manager was the Czechoslovak Antonin Fivebr, who was at the club from 1923 until 1927, and in a second stint at the club from 1929 until 1931.

Of the 60 people to have managed Valencia, 35 have been Spaniards and 25 foreigners. In some cases, the Spaniards have been former Valencia players that agreed to take charge after the sacking of the regular manager that season, as were the cases of Eduardo Cubells, Pasieguito or Manolo Mestre.

The main nationalities barring Spaniards have been Argentinian (6 managers), English (4), Italian and Yugoslav (3). The club has also had two Uruguayan managers, two Brazilians, two Dutch, a Paraguayan, a Frenchman, a Serb, a Portuguese and a Czechoslovak. While the origin of the majority of the Spanish managers have been Valencian (9) and Basque (8).

List
Information correct as of 12 February 2023. Only competitive matches are counted.

Nationalities

  Spain (34):
  Valencian Community (10): Leopoldo Costa Rino, Eduardo Cubells, Óscar Rubén Valdez, Manolo Mestre, Roberto Gil, Paco Real, Jose Manuel Rielo, Óscar Fernandez, Voro, and Jose Bordalas.
  Basque Country (8): Jacinto Quincoces, Carlos Iturraspe, Bernardino Pérez "Pasieguito", Edmundo Suárez "Mundo", Sabino Barinaga, "Koldo" Aguirre, Unai Emery and Pako Ayestarán.
  Catalonia (5): Luis Miró, Domingo Balmanya, Salvador Artigas, Enrique Buqué and Albert Celades.
  Madrid (3): Luis Aragonés, Rafael Benítez and Quique Sánchez Flores.
  Galicia (3): Andrés Balsa, Ramón Encinas Dios and Luis Casas Pasarín.
  Asturias (2): Francisco García "Paquito" and Marcelino García Toral.
  Castile and León (2): José Iglesias Fernández and Rubén Baraja.
  Andalusia (1): Antonio López.
  Navarre (1): Javi Gracia.
  Argentina (5) Alejandro Scapelli, Alfredo Di Stéfano, Jorge Valdano, Héctor Cúper, Mauricio Pellegrino and Juan Antonio Pizzi.
  England (4): James Herriot, Rodolfo Galloway, Jack Greenwell and Gary Neville.
  Italy (3): Claudio Ranieri ,Cesare Prandelli and Gennaro Gattuso.
  Yugoslavia (3): Milovan Ciric, Dragoljub Milosevic and Miljan Miljanic.
  Brazil (2): Pedro Otto Bumbel and Carlos Alberto Parreira.
  Uruguay (2): Víctor Espárrago and Héctor Nuñez.
  Netherlands (2): Guus Hiddink and Ronald Koeman.
  Paraguay (1): Heriberto Herrea.
  Czech Republic (1): Anton Fivber.
  France (1): Marcel Domingo.
  Serbia (1): Miroslav Dukic.
  Portugal (1): Nuno Espírito Santo.

Records

Most games in all official competitions

  Alfredo Di Stéfano: 303
   Jacinto Quincoces: 229 
  Unai Emery: 218 
  Rafael Benítez: 163 
  Mundo: 159

References 

Managers
 
Valencia
Managers